U.S. Route 58 (US 58) is an east–west U.S. Highway that runs for  from U.S. Route 25E just northwest of Harrogate, Tennessee, to U.S. Route 60 in Virginia Beach, Virginia. Until 1996, when the Cumberland Gap Tunnel opened, US 58 ran only inside the commonwealth of Virginia (and it now runs only about 1 mile outside of Virginia into Tennessee before terminating). It was then extended southwest along a short piece of former US 25E, which no longer enters Virginia, to end at the new alignment in Tennessee.  For most of its alignment, it closely parallels Virginia's southern border with North Carolina.

State Route 383  (SR 383) is overlaid on U.S. Route 58 in Tennessee.

U.S. Route 58 is the longest numbered route in Virginia.

Route description

Tennessee

US 58 begins at a trumpet interchange with US 25E, just south of the Cumberland Gap Tunnel. The interchange is located on the border of the municipalities of Cumberland Gap and Harrogate, within Claiborne County. The route travels northeast as a four lane divided highway, through a small section of Cumberland Gap with a few businesses. US 58 then abruptly leaves Cumberland Gap and enters a small section of a rural area within Harrogate, passing along the southeastern edge of the Cumberland Gap National Historical Park. After intersecting a road leading to the park and the historical area in Cumberland Gap, the route leaves the state of Tennessee and enters the commonwealth of Virginia, after only about a half mile in Tennessee.

US 58 in Tennessee carries the designation State Route 383.

Virginia

Tennessee to Jonesville
Upon entering Virginia, US 58 also enters Lee County and becomes Wilderness Road. The divided highway makes a reverse turn heading generally towards the east, in a forested region, before turning east-northeast after to the south of the Wilderness Road entrance to the Cumberland Gap National Historical Park. US 58 crosses over Station Creek, before curving due east through the hamlet of Gibson Station. Past Gibson Station, the highway passes northeast through an area of a rolling hills with homes surrounding either side of the road. It is paralleled by Indian Creek on its southeast side, with the route crossing over its Pendleton Branch, prior to intersecting SR 691 in the village of Wheeler. US 58 continues northeast from Wheeler, before turning due east again while passing along the southern edge of the Wilderness Road State Park. The route crosses Indian Creek twice, before intersecting SR 684 to the southwest of a park and ride lot, and the DeBusk Veterinary Teaching Center of Lincoln Memorial University. The route then dips south through more rural areas of rolling hills, residences, and farmland before turning northeast once more. After passing through some hill cuts with stone sides and crossing over the Roaring Branch of Indian Creek, US 58 reaches the unincorporated town of Ewing. At Ewing, the route reaches its first intersection with a gantry, as its intersection with SR 724 has a blinking yellow light above it. US 58 continues northeast through more rural forests and farmland along the southeastern slope of Poor Valley Ridge, before reaching the unincorporated town of Rose Hill. In Rose Hill, more businesses and houses appear along the edges of the road, and a jersey barrier briefly forms in the median before the road crosses over the White Branch of the Powell River. Beyond the crossing, the median reverts to a grassy surface as US 58 leaves Rose Hill. The route continues to pass more homes, mainly in the traditional style, and businesses, mainly those that are timber shed retailers, before it makes a brief turn to the due east. Here US 58 crosses over Burning Well Road, Hardy Creek, and the railroad line of CSX Transportation (former L&N) leading to the Hagan's Switchback, on a twin-span beam bridge. The route then turns back towards the northeast and crosses the Hugh C. Chance Memorial Bridge. US 58 then makes a curve to the southeast through hilly wooded areas, before crossing over Dry Creek and meeting State Routes 880 and 758 at an intersection. The latter road provides access to the Lee County Airport. Past the intersection, US 58 briefly gains an eastbound climbing lane, before narrowing back to two lanes in each direction. The route continues east before heading northeast through wooded residential areas. Soon US 58 narrows to a two-lane rural road heading east through hilly residential zones entering the town limits of Jonesville, the county seat of Lee County.

Jonesville to Virginia Beach
East of Jonesville, US 58 intersects US 421, and the two routes stay concurrent through Duffield (where the concurrency also picks up U.S. 23), Gate City, Weber City (where the US 23 concurrency ends), and Bristol, where US 58 begins a concurrency with Interstate 81. The two routes stay concurrent until I-81 exit 19 in Abingdon, where US 58 resumes its eastward journey close to the Virginia–North Carolina state line. The route is signed as the J.E.B. Stuart Highway and the A. L. Philpott Memorial Highway. Much of the highway through the region features hairpin turns, steep grades, and load-zoned bridges.

US 58 begins a concurrency with US 221 in Independence, and the routes stay merged through Hillsville, just past the interchange with Interstate 77. Continuing eastward, the route crosses the Blue Ridge Parkway in the unincorporated community of Meadows of Dan before winding its way to Martinsville, where US 58 and US 220 share a southern bypass of the city. Between Stuart and the Martinsville bypass, several loops are found following the original alignment. East of Martinsville, a loop between Byrd's Store and Axton follows the original alignment, although one section west of Byrd's Store and one section east of Chatmoss remain inaccessible. Between Martinsville and Danville and between Danville and South Boston the route was widened to four lanes as part of the Arterial Highway system initiated by the Commonwealth in the mid 1960s. A newer alignment was generally just added to the older alignment. A loop of the older alignment is visible east of Brosville.

Approaching Danville, US 58 once again follows an expressway bypass to the south of the city, while a business route enters the city itself. The southeastern half of this bypass is shared with US 29. East of Danville, US 29 continues north, while US 58 picks up US 360 (which begins in central Danville) and resumes its eastward journey. The routes stay cosigned until South Boston, where US 360 resumes a more northerly route to Richmond, while US 58 travels eastward to Clarksville and crosses Kerr Lake.

The route crosses US Route 1 and Interstate 85 in South Hill, followed by Interstate 95 in Emporia. Near Franklin, an expressway bypass carries US 58 (and, for one stretch, US 258) south of the city, while a business route enters the city. A bypass also carries traffic around Suffolk, where US 58 begins concurrencies with US 13 and then US 460. The three US routes stay merged until an intersection with the Hampton Roads Beltway at the confluence of Interstate 64, Interstate 264, and Interstate 664. US 58 travels inside the beltway and through Portsmouth and into Norfolk via the Midtown Tunnel. The route crosses I-64 once again, and continues to Virginia Beach, roughly paralleling I-264 to its south. US 58, designated as Virginia Beach Boulevard and becoming Laskin Rd. in Virginia Beach, ends at US 60, Pacific Ave. Historically, US 58 continued for one additional block to the east, ending at Atlantic Ave., which once carried US 60 and then Business US 60.

Much of the western section of US 58 is part of Crooked Road, Virginia and The Crooked Road: Virginia's Heritage Music Trail.

Alternate route 

An alternate route of US 58, known as U.S. Route 58 Alternate (US 58 Alt.), splits from the main route in Abingdon, Virginia and travels northwest (signed west) as the "Trail of the Lonesome Pine" to Coeburn. From there, US 58 Alt. travels in a southwesterly direction (signed west) through Norton, Big Stone Gap and Pennington Gap before rejoining the main route in Jonesville.

History
The corridor across southern Virginia was part of the initial 1918 state highway system, in which it was State Route 12. It generally followed the present U.S. 58 from Abingdon to Virginia Beach, while present US 58 west of Abingdon was part of State Route 10. These routes deviated from present US 58 in the following places:
SR 10 left Virginia into Kentucky at Cumberland Gap; the piece of current US 58 into Tennessee was (in general terms) State Route 107 from 1923 to 1928 and State Route 100 from 1928 to 1933 (as well as U.S. Route 25E from 1926 to 1996).
SR 10 used present U.S. Route 58 Alternate from Jonesville to Pennington Gap and U.S. 421 southeast back to U.S. 58.
SR 10 used present State Route 638 and State Route 600 from near Pattonsville to Clinchport.
SR 10 used present U.S. 421 and U.S. Route 11 through Bristol to Abingdon. From Abingdon to Meadowview, where SR 12 began, SR 10 used present State Route 609.
SR 12 used present State Route 80 and State Route 803 from Meadowview to Lodi and roughly present State Route 91 to Damascus.
From Danville to Boydton, SR 12 used present State Route 360 to near Scottsburg, U.S. Route 360 to Clover, and State Route 92 to Boydton. Present US 58 was State Route 44 (formed ca. 1930) from Danville to Clarksville, and from Clarksville to Boydton it was initially part of State Route 1, renumbered State Route 31 in the 1923 renumbering, State Route 324 from soon after 1923 to 1927, part of State Route 201 from 1927 to 1928, and State Route 400 from 1928 to 1933.
From Suffolk to Portsmouth, SR 12 used present State Route 337.

Major intersections

See also
Virginia Beach Boulevard

Related U.S. Routes
U.S. Route 158
U.S. Route 258
Special routes of U.S. Route 58

References

External links

 Virginia Highways Project: US 58
 Endpoints of U.S. Highway 58

 
U.S. Highways in Virginia
U.S. Highways in Tennessee
Galax, Virginia
Transportation in Claiborne County, Tennessee
U.S. Route 058
U.S. Route 058
U.S. Route 058
U.S. Route 058
U.S. Route 058
U.S. Route 058
U.S. Route 058
U.S. Route 058
U.S. Route 058
U.S. Route 058
U.S. Route 058
U.S. Route 058
U.S. Route 058
U.S. Route 058
U.S. Route 058
U.S. Route 058
U.S. Route 058
U.S. Route 058
U.S. Route 058
U.S. Route 058
U.S. Route 058
U.S. Route 058
U.S. Route 058
United States Numbered Highway System